The Georgia national football team represents the country of Georgia in men's international football matches, and it is controlled by the Georgian Football Federation. The Georgian team's first match took place in 1990, while Georgia was still part of the Soviet Union. The team have attempted to qualify for each major tournament from Euro 1996 onwards, but have not achieved qualification yet, although they came very close to Euro 2020. Home games are played at the Boris Paichadze Dinamo Arena in Tbilisi.

History

The history of the Georgia national football team began in 1990, when the team played their first international match against Lithuania, the first country to accept an invitation. The match was held on 27 May 1990 at national stadium. Georgia were coached by Givi Nodia. The friendly match ended in a 2–2 draw. This was the only match prior to the declaration of independence on 9 April 1991. Soon afterwards the team played another friendly match against Moldova.

The Georgian Football Federation became a member of both UEFA and FIFA in 1992, enabling Georgia to play competitive matches. The first of these came in September 1994, a 1–0 defeat to Moldova as part of the qualifiers for Euro 1996. Georgia finished third in their group, ahead of Moldova, Wales and Albania, but seven points behind second-placed qualifier Bulgaria.

Georgia failed to qualify for 1998 FIFA World Cup in France, obtaining 10 points and finishing in fourth place, level on points with Poland. At this time Georgia reached forty-second place in the FIFA World Ranking.

During UEFA Euro 2000 qualifying the Georgia national team won one match, drew two and finished at the bottom of the group with five points. This marked the beginning of a period of decline for Georgian football.

The team finished fifth (and last) with seven points in their qualifying group for Euro 2004, although they defeated Russia with a goal scored by Malkhaz Asatiani.

In the 2006 FIFA World Cup qualifiers Georgia beat Albania 2–0 at home and Kazakhstan away 2–1. They finished sixth (second bottom) with ten points in Group 2.

Georgia were sixth out of seven teams in the UEFA Euro 2008 qualifying group with ten points. They defeated Scotland 2–0 at home and the Faroe Islands 6–0 away and 3–1 at home.

Héctor Cúper became the manager of Georgia in August 2008. During the qualification round for the 2010 FIFA World Cup Georgia failed to win any matches and finished sixth (and last) with three points. Cuper didn't extend his contract, and on 6 November 2009 Temur Ketsbaia was appointed as the new manager of the Georgian national football team. Ketsbaia resigned as manager after a 4–0 defeat at home to Poland in the UEFA Euro 2016 qualifiers on 14 November 2014, having previously stated he would do so before the match regardless of the result.

In June 2016, Georgia beat the two-times reigning European champions Spain 1–0 in their final pre-Euro 2016 friendly.

In 2018, they were the first team to earn promotion in the new UEFA Nations League. They scored the event's first goal in a UEFA Nations League D game in Kazakhstan before beating Latvia twice and Andorra, with 2 games still to spare. In the UEFA Euro 2020 qualifying, Georgia had a disappointing run, with their only wins came over Gibraltar. Still, having finished first place in League D, Georgia was able to qualify for the country's first ever major playoff. Georgia managed to beat Belarus 1–0 and thus the hope to qualify for UEFA Euro 2020 increased, but it went in vain after the Georgians suffered a heartbreaking home defeat to North Macedonia in the decisive match and thus missed the opportunity to make a historic debut in a major competition.

Georgia showed improvements with a strong 2-0 win over Sweden at the 2022 World Cup qualification on 11 November 2021.

Recent results and forthcoming fixtures

2022

2023

Coaching staff

Coaching history
As of 19 November 2019

Players

Current squad
The following players are called up for a friendly match against  and a UEFA Euro 2024 qualifying match against  on March 25 and 28, 2023.

Caps and goals correct as of 19 November 2022, after the match against Morocco.

Recent call-ups
The following players have not been called up for the upcoming matches but have been called up for the team in the last 12 months.

Records

Players in bold are still active with Georgia.

Most appearances

Top goalscorers

Competitive record

FIFA World Cup

UEFA European Championship

UEFA Nations League

Head-to-head record
As of 17 November 2022

Notable results

See also

Football in Georgia
List of Georgia international footballers
Georgia national football team results
List of Georgian national football team captains
Georgia national under-21 football team
Georgia national under-19 football team
Georgia national under-17 football team
Georgia national futsal team
Georgia national beach soccer team

References

External links

Georgian Football Federation
FIFA profile
UEFA profile
RSSSF archive of results 1990–
RSSSF archive of most capped players and highest goalscorers
Archive of results 1990–

 
European national association football teams